Bruce Edward Roberts (June 23, 1942 – December 30, 2022) was an American curler from Hibbing, Minnesota.

Awards
 United States Curling Association Hall of Fame:
 1988 (as curler);
 1994 (with all 1976 world champions team: third Joe Roberts, second Gary Kleffman and lead Jerry Scott).

Personal life and death
Bruce Roberts was employed as a primary school teacher. His younger brother, Joe, was a curler too and Bruce's teammate. 

Roberts lived in Orr, Minnesota, and attended Bemidji State University. He taught in Duluth and Nett Lake. Roberts had two children.

Roberts died on December 30, 2022, at the age of 80.

Teams

Notes

References

External links
 

1942 births
2022 deaths
American male curlers
World curling champions
American curling champions
Sportspeople from Hibbing, Minnesota
Bemidji State University alumni
Schoolteachers from Minnesota